Armando Larios Jiménez (May 21, 1951 – July 22, 2021) was a Colombian Roman Catholic prelate and priest. He served as the Bishop of the Roman Catholic Diocese of Magangué from 1994 to 2001 and the Bishop of the Roman Catholic Diocese of Riohacha from 2001 to 2004.

Born in Barranquilla in 1951, Armando Larios Jiménez died of a heart attack in Monterrey, Mexico, on July 22, 2021, at the age of 70.

References

1951 births
2021 deaths
People from Barranquilla
Colombian Roman Catholic bishops